Mid-term parliamentary elections were held in Costa Rica on 2 December 1921. The Agricultural Party received the most votes, but only won 25.5% of the total. Voter turnout was 30.4%.

Results

References

1921 elections in Central America
1921 in Costa Rica
Elections in Costa Rica